Lordiversity is a box set by the Finnish rock band Lordi. The box set contains their eleventh to seventeenth studio albums: Skelectric Dinosaur, Superflytrap, The Masterbeast from the Moon, Abusement Park, Humanimals, Abracadaver and Spooky Sextravaganza Spectacular. It is a follow-up to the band's previous release Killection. It is the final release to feature founding member and guitarist Amen.

The box set was released on CD and vinyl formats on 26 November 2021 via AFM Records. The albums were published on digital platforms separately from November 2021 to February 2022.

Production 
After the COVID-19 pandemic had postponed their tour in support of Killection, the band decided to use the extra time to start working on more material to release a week after the postponement. Mr Lordi stated: "It was clear that it is the time to start planning the new album, even though Killection was released not even two months before. I was thinking that the most boring thing we could do after Killection, is to do another basic Lordi album. And I was very much enjoying the different styles of song writing, recording and production on Killection, but another boring idea would have been to do a part two."

On 6 April 2021, it was announced that Lordi would be releasing no less than seven studio albums in October 2021. In the statement regarding the albums, the band said: "The albums will sound all different from each other, they're all in different styles and fictional eras in the Killection timeline. Five of the seven albums are already done, by the way, and number six is well on the way." Mr Lordi originally wanted to do ten albums for the boxset, but the label told him that it was too much and that seven albums were fine.

On 19 August 2021, the band had released their single, "Believe Me", and had at the same time announced Lordiversity. The second single, "Abracadaver", was released on 24 September 2021. The third single "Borderline", was released on 22 October 2021, along with a music video. On 24 November 2021, the fourth single "Merry Blah Blah Blah" was released. On 17 December 2021, the fifth single "Demon Supreme" was released. On 7 January 2022, the sixth single "Day Off of the Devil" was released.

Composition

Influences, style and themes 
For Skelectric Dinosaur, the band used the influences of early Kiss and Alice Cooper. The cover design references the Hotter than Hell cover art. Superflytrap is inspired by the bands Earth, Wind & Fire, Boney M. and Bee Gees. On The Masterbeast from the Moon, the band was influenced by Rush and Pink Floyd. Set on a fictional timeline of 1983 and 1984, Abusement Park has a classic heavy metal sound influenced by W.A.S.P., Twisted Sister, Kiss, and Scorpions, and includes a Christmas-themed single, the aforementioned "Merry Blah Blah Blah". The AOR influenced sound in Humanimals is influenced by Bon Jovi, Desmond Child and Alice Cooper. Set on a fictional timeline for 1991, Abracadaver is inspired by Anthrax, Metallica, and Pantera. The last record from 1995, Spooky Sextravaganza Spectacular, is machine-made.

The fictional release years for the various albums are: 1975, 1979, 1981, 1984, 1989, 1991 and 1995.

Track listing

Skelectric Dinosaur

Superflytrap

The Masterbeast from the Moon

Abusement Park

Humanimals

Abracadaver

Spooky Sextravaganza Spectacular

Personnel 
Credits for Lordiversity adapted from liner notes.

Lordi
 Mr Lordi – lead and backing vocals, guitars, programming, whistle, orchestration, engineering, mixing, production
 Amen – guitars
 Mana – drums, backing vocals, programming, engineering, mixing, co-production
 Hella – keyboards, backing vocals
 Hiisi – bass guitar

Additional personnel
 Ralph Ruiz – vocals
 Dylan Broda – vocals
 Tracy Lipp – vocals, backing vocals
 Michael Monroe – saxophone on "Like a Bee to the Honey"
 Annariina Rautanen – flute on "Moonbeast" and "Yoh-Haee-Von"
 Tony Kakko – backing vocals on "Rollercoaster"
 Joonas Suotamo – Chewbacca voice on "Grrr!"
 Kari A. Kilgast – vocals on "Like a Bee to the Honey"
 Hulk the Bulldog – voice on "Beastwood"
 Maki Kolehmainen – cowbell, backing vocals
 John Bartolome – vocals
 Lara Anastasia Mertanen – intro lead on "Drekavac"

Backing vocals
 Jessica Love, Maria Jyrkäs, Kaarle Westlie, Ville Virtanen, Olli Virtanen, Isabella Larsson, Noora Kosmina, Katja Auvinen, Riitta Hyyppä, Josefin Silén, Minna Virtanen, Antton Ruusunen, Niki Westerback, Marja Kortelainen, Tom Roine, Netta Laurenne

Children vocals
 Lumen Broda
 Leia Broda
 Lili Wasenius
 Aviana Westerback
 Roxana Westerback

Production

 Janne Halmkrona – co-production, backing vocals
 Visa Mertanen – orchestral production and instrumentation
 Tom Higgins – engineering, backing vocals
 Joe McGinness – engineering, backing vocals
 Matti Vatanen – engineering
 Nalle – engineering, additional keyboards, synth programming
 JC Halttunen – engineering
 M. Onster – engineering
 Madu Vatanen – engineering
 Mikko Karmila – engineering, mixing
 Juuso Nordlund – mixing
 Ilkka Herkman – mixing
 Rake Eskolin – mixing
 Janne Huotari – engineering, mixing
 Jussi Jaakonaho – mixing
 Ilkka Herkman – mixing
 Rake Eskolin – mixing
 Toivo Hellberg – engineering, mixing, vocals, backing vocals
 Jorma Hämäläinen – engineering, mixing, mastering
 Mika Jussila – mastering
 Jaakko Viitalähde – mastering
 Henkka Niemistö – mastering
 Eero Kokko – photography

Charts

References 

2021 albums
AFM Records albums
Disco albums
Industrial metal albums
Lordi albums
Progressive rock albums by Finnish artists
Thrash metal albums by Finnish artists